Barbirey-sur-Ouche (literally Barbirey on Ouche) is a commune in the Côte-d'Or department in the Bourgogne-Franche-Comté region of eastern France.

The inhabitants of the commune are known as Barbirotins or Barbirotines.

Geography
Barbirey-sur-Ouche is located some 25 km south-west of Dijon and 11 km east of Créancey. Access to the commune is by the D33 road from Gissey-sur-Ouche in the north-east which passes through the village and continues south to Saint-Victor-sur-Ouche. The D114 goes west from the village then north-west to Grenant-lès-Sombernon. The commune is heavily forested on the hillsides to the north and south with farmland in the valley.

The Ouche river passes through the commune just east of the village flowing from south to north to eventually join the Saône just east of Saint-Jean-de-Losne. The Ruisseau de la Gironde flows from the west down the valley to join the Ouche near the village. The Canal de Bourgogne (Burgundy Canal) also passes through the commune parallel to the Ouche on the eastern side. There are two locks in the commune - the Écluse de Dainevy to the south and another lock further north.

History
On 17 March 1794 Jean Vivant Micault de Corbeton (10 May 1725 - 17 March 1794), Chairman of the Parliament of Burgundy in Dijon before the French revolution, Lord of Agey, Meilly-sur-Rouvres, Rouvres-sous-Meilly, Saligny, Liernolles, Maconge, Barbirey-sur-Ouche, Santenay, Pommard, and other places, last Marquis of Joncy, and husband of Marie Françoise Trudaine, was beheaded in the Place du Morimont (now the Place Emile Zola) in Dijon.

Barbirey-sur-Ouche appears as Barbirey fur Ouche on the 1750 Cassini Map and the same on the 1790 version.

Heraldry

Administration

List of Successive Mayors

Demography
In 2017 the commune had 216 inhabitants.

Culture and heritage

Civil heritage

The commune has a number of buildings and sites that are registered as historical monuments:
A Vineyard (19th century)
Houses and Farms (18th-19th century)
A Chateau (16th century)
The Chateau Grounds (17th century)
A Lavoir (Public laundry) at Jaugey (1836). The Lavoir contains two items that are registered as historical objects:
A Bronze Bell (1515)
The Furniture in the Lavoir
A Lavoir (Public laundry) (1863)
A School (19th century)

Other sites of interest
A Tumulus and cave at Roche-Chèvre

Barbirey-sur-Ouche Picture Gallery

Religious heritage

The commune has several religious buildings and structures that are registered as historical monuments:
The Parish Church of Saint Martin (12th century). The Church contains many items that are registered as historical objects:
A Bronze Bell (1521)
Statues (16th-19th century)
The Furniture in the Church
A Half-relief: Adoration of the Shepherds (18th century)
A Retable (18th century)

See also
Communes of the Côte-d'Or department

References

Communes of Côte-d'Or